George Stuart FRSE LLD (1715–18 June 1793) was an 18th-century Scottish classicist. He was joint founder of the Royal Society of Edinburgh in 1783.

Life

From 1741 to 1775 he was Professor of Humanities at the University of Edinburgh also serving as the University Librarian during this period. The humanities course included the teaching of Latin and the study of Roman Antiquities.

In 1773 he was living in private rooms at Old College.

He corresponded with many well-known figures of the period including William Smellie  David Steuart Erskine, 11th Earl of Buchan and William Little of Liberton.

He died at Fisherrow in Musselburgh on 18 June 1793.

Family

He was father of Gilbert Stuart (1742-1786) who predeceased him.

References

1715 births
1793 deaths
Academics of the University of Edinburgh
Fellows of the Royal Society of Edinburgh